4 Paoni - Coptic calendar - 6 Paoni

Fixed commemorations
All fixed commemorations below are observed on 5 Paoni (12 June) by the Coptic Orthodox Church.

Saints
Saint James the Confessor
Saint Pishay the Martyr and Saint Peter the Martyr

Commemorations
Consecration of the Church of Saint Victor in Sho

References
Coptic Synexarion

Days of the Coptic calendar